Chek Lap Kok is an island in the western waters of Hong Kong's New Territories. Unlike the smaller Lam Chau, it was only partially leveled when it was assimilated via land reclamation into the  island for the current Hong Kong International Airport, which opened for commercial aviation in 1998. The airport is popularly referred to as Chek Lap Kok Airport to distinguish it from the former Hong Kong International Airport, now commonly known as Kai Tak Airport.

Hong Kong SkyCity, a business and entertainment complex, is also located on Chek Lap Kok. It includes AsiaWorld–Expo, a convention and exhibition centre, which opened in 2005. Cathay Pacific City, the head office of Cathay Pacific; HAECO, and formerly Hong Kong Airlines are also located on the airport platform.

Name
The name of the island may be derived from the bareness of the island ('da chek lak'), that the shape of the island resembles the red tripletail Perch ('chek lap', 赤鱲), or that the fish was once abundant in its vicinity.

Geography
The island is located north of Lantau Island off Ma Wan Chung and Tung Chung. The southern end of the island formed a small peninsula, which has been left largely undeveloped. This area is facing Tung Chung and is now named Scenic Hill. It is the site of the Ancient Kiln Park and the Airport Island Angle Station of the Ngong Ping 360 cable car.

History
The island has been inhabited on and off since the Middle Neolithic period 6,000 years ago.

During the 19th and 20th centuries, the inhabitants of the island practised farming, including rice cultivation, and quarrying.

At the time of the 1911 census, the population of Chek Lap Kok was 77. The number of males was 55. The population was about 200 in the 1950s, rising sharply in the 1960s. The population later declined, with some 20 families remaining on the island when the plan for the construction of a new airport was announced in the early 1990s.

Archeological surveys and investigations were conducted on the island starting in the late 1970s. A salvage archaeology project started in October 1990.

The original farming and fishing villages on the island were relocated to Chek Lap Kok New Village aka. Chek Lap Kok San Tsuen near Tung Chung on Lantau Island. A Tin Hau Temple had been built in 1823 at the north east of the island. The entire temple was built of granite quarried on the island. It was dismantled in 1991 and rebuilt in 1994 at its present location. Chek Lap Kok San Tsuen is a recognized village under the New Territories Small House Policy.

Also, Romer's tree frog (Philautus romeri), a unique species of finger-sized frog found only in Hong Kong, was relocated from Chek Lap Kok to new habitats on Lantau Island before construction of the airport.

A third runway at Hong Kong Airport is being built as part of the Hong Kong International Airport Master Plan 2030.

Climate

See also

References

External links

 Delineation of area of existing village Chek Lap Kok (Tung Chung) for election of resident representative (2019 to 2022) (Chek Lap Kok New Village)

 
Artificial islands of Hong Kong
Islands District
Restricted areas of Hong Kong red public minibus
Islands of Hong Kong
Populated places in Hong Kong